The England women's national Rugby League team represents England in Women's Rugby League. They are administered by the Rugby Football League. As Great Britain, they toured Australia in 1996, New Zealand in 1998, and reached the first-ever Women's Rugby League World Cup Final in 2000, where they lost 26–4 to New Zealand.

Great Britain toured Australia in 2002 and took part in the 2003 World Cup. In 2006, the RFL announced that, after the men's 2007 All Golds Tour, the Great Britain team would no longer compete on a regular basis, and that players would be able to represent England, Wales and Scotland at Test level.

It is planned that the Great Britain team will come together in future only for occasional tours.

All-time head-to-head records 
Table last updated 14 November 2022 (after World Cup Semi-Final match against New Zealand)

Players
Squad for the postponed 2021 Women's Rugby League World Cup to be held in England in November 2022. 
Tallies in the table include the Semi-Final match against New Zealand.

Note: * = Player's age estimated based on previous articles on various news and rugby league websites.

Results

Full internationals 
 

Upcoming Fixtures: 
 England v France on 29 April 2023 at Halliwell Jones Stadium, Warrington

England Lions

Nines

History

Early years
Women's Rugby League was originally established in 1985 through the Women's Amateur Rugby League Association, with the Great Britain National Team playing for the first time in the year 2000.

From 2008 onwards, England has competed on the international stage, playing in the 2008, 2013, 2017 and 2021 Women's Rugby League World Cups to date.

2008 World Cup 
The 2008 Women's Rugby League World Cup was the third staging of the tournament and the first time England had competed as a nation. The tournament was held in Australia from 26 October and England were in a pool with Russia, France and Australia.

England beat France and Russia in the group stages, losing to Australia, to finish second in the group and qualify for the semi-finals. England were beaten by eventual winners New Zealand at the semi-final stage, as they beat Australia 34–0. England beat the Pacific Islands in the third-placed play-off match.

2013 World Cup 
The 2013 Women's Rugby League World Cup was held in Great Britain from 26 October and featured Australia, England, France and New Zealand. England's 24-player squad featured players from Bradford, Coventry, Crosfields, Featherstone, Normanton and Thatto Heath.

In the Round Robin format, England suffered a 14–6 defeat to Australia at the Tetley's Stadium, Dewsbury, on Friday, 5 July, before going down 34–16 to New Zealand on Monday, 8 July at Featherstone Rovers’ Post Office Road.

A 42–4 win over France followed in the final round on 11 July at the Fox's Biscuits Stadium, Batley, before a record 54–0 win over France in the third-place play-off at the South Leeds Stadium, Hunslet.

2017 World Cup 
The 2017 Women's Rugby League World Cup was the fifth staging of the competition, held in Australia between 16 November and 2 December. England took part alongside Australia, Canada, Cook Islands, New Zealand and Papua New Guinea and all group matches were played at the Southern Cross Group Stadium, home of Cronulla Sharks.

England were placed in Group A alongside Australia and the Cook Islands and took on Papua New Guinea in an inter-group match. Their first 2017 Women's Rugby League World Cup match resulted in a 38–0 defeat to Australia on 19 November, before a shock 22–16 defeat to the Cook Islands on 22 November. England were 16-0 down at half time, but Emma Slowe, Amy Hardcastle and Kayleigh Bulman scored for England in the second half, Claire Garner kicking two goals, to make it 16-all, before a late Cook Islands try. England secured their progress to the semi-finals on points difference from the Cooks thanks to a 36–8 win over Papua New Guinea on 16 November. Tries from Charlotte Booth (2), Shona Hoyle, Amy Hardcastle, Tara-Jane Stanley, who kicked four goals, Danielle Bound and Beth Sutcliffe were enough to secure the win.

The semi-final saw England beaten 52-4 by New Zealand on 26 November at Southern Cross Group Stadium, despite a first-half Tara-Jane Stanley try.

Australia would go on to win the final 23–16 on 2 December at Suncorp Stadium, Brisbane.

Coaches

Head coach 
Joe Warburton (2007)

Brenda Dobek (2008–2010)

Anthony Sullivan (2011)

Steve McCormack (2012)

Chris Chapman (2013–2017)

Craig Richards (2018–22)

Assistant coach 
Neil Gregg & Brenda Dobek (2007)

Neil Gregg & Anita Naughton (2007–2009)

Nigel Johnson (2009–2012)

Nigel Johnson & Thomas Brindle (2011)

Thomas Brindle (2012–2017)

Lindsay Anfield (2018–present)

Records
This section last updated 10 November 2022.

Team
Biggest Win:  England 72-0 Russia  , 6/11/2008 – Women's Rugby League World Cup, Stockland Park, Sunshine Coast.

Biggest Defeat:  52-4 England , 26/11/2017 – Women's Rugby League World Cup semi-final, Southern Cross Group Stadium, Sydney

Individual
Most Caps

Most Tries: Amy Hardcastle - 26, Emily Rudge - 15, Tara-Jane Stanley - 14, Joanne Watmore - 13 , Natalie Gilmour MBE - 13, Jodie Cunningham - 10.

Most Tries in a Match: Emily Rudge - 4 vs , 1st Test at Goroka, Sat 9/11/2019

Most Points: Tara-Jane Stanley 174, Natalie Gilmour MBE - (at least) 114, Amy Hardcastle 104.

Notes:

World Cup

World Cup Appearances 

Source: England Women (World Cup) at Rugby League Record Keepers Club

See also

 Rugby league in England
 England men's national rugby league team
 England national wheelchair rugby league team
 Great Britain women's national rugby league team
 Rugby Football League
 British Rugby League Hall of Fame

References

External links
 

 
Women's national rugby league teams